Brome is a municipality in the district of Gifhorn, in Lower Saxony, Germany. It is situated on the river Ohre, approx. 25 km northeast of Wolfsburg.

The municipality consists of the following villages:
 Altendorf
 Benitz
 Brome
 Wiswedel
 Zicherie

Brome is also the seat of the Samtgemeinde Brome ("collective municipality").

References

Gifhorn (district)